Schizaea fistulosa,  the narrow comb fern is a small plant found in a variety of habitats. Widespread but a fairly uncommon fern found in southern Australia. Also seen in other countries such as New Zealand, Chile and New Caledonia. A low plant, 4 to 30 cm tall in moist situations. The specific epithet fistulosa means "tube shaped".

This plant first appeared in scientific literature in the year 1807, published in the Novae Hollandiae Plantarum Specimen. Described from a Tasmanian plant by the French botanist, Jacques Labillardière.

References

Schizaeales
Flora of New South Wales
Flora of Western Australia
Flora of Victoria (Australia)
Flora of South Australia
Flora of New Zealand
Flora of New Caledonia
Flora of Tasmania
Flora of Borneo
Flora of New Guinea
Flora of Madagascar
Flora of Chile
Flora of the Falkland Islands
Plants described in 1807